Amata ntebi is a moth of the family Erebidae. It was described by George Thomas Bethune-Baker in 1911. It is found in Uganda.

References

 Natural History Museum Lepidoptera generic names catalog

Endemic fauna of Uganda
ntebi
Moths described in 1911
Moths of Africa